Jakob Jochmann (born 2 October 1993) is an Austrian handball player for UHK Krems and the Austrian national team.

He represented Austria at the 2020 European Men's Handball Championship.

References

1993 births
Living people
Austrian male handball players
Handball players from Vienna